Désiré "Dis" Keteleer (13 June 1920 – 17 September 1970) was a Belgian professional road bicycle racer. Keteleer was born in Anderlecht and was professional from 1942 until 1961, winning the inaugural Tour of Romandie in 1947 and La Flèche Wallonne in 1946. He rode in the 1949 Tour de France, winning stage 15. Keteleer died in Rebecq-Rognon.

Major results

1943
 3rd La Flèche Wallonne
1945
 3rd Overall Tour of Belgium
1st Stages 3 & 5
 3rd Nokere Koerse
 10th Omloop Het Volk
 1946
 1st Brussels–Spa
 1st La Flèche Wallonne
 7th Overall Tour of Belgium
1st Stage 5
 8th Overall Tour de Luxembourg
 1947
 1st Elfstedenronde
 1st Kampenhout–Charleroi–Kampenhout
 1st Scheldt–Dender–Lys
 1st Overall Tour de Romandie
1st Stages 1B & 2
 1st Stages 6 & 7 Tour de Suisse
 1948
 1st Circuit des régions frontalières
 1st Roubaix–Huy
 1st Stage 11 Giro d'Italia
 1949
 1st Stage 15 Tour de France
 2nd Overall Tour of the Netherlands
 8th Omloop Het Volk
 1950
 1st Stages 5, 8, 13 & 17 Deutschland Tour
 1st Stage 2 Tour de Romandie
 1st Stage 3 Volta a Catalunya
 3rd Züri-Metzgete
 1952
 1st Stage 4 Giro d'Italia
 1st Stage 1 Tour de Suisse
 5th Overall Paris–Nice
 6th 1952 Paris–Roubaix
 7th Tour of Flanders
 9th La Flèche Wallonne
1953
 2nd Tour of Flanders
 5th Gent–Wevelgem
 8th 1953 Paris–Roubaix
 1955
 2nd Gent–Wevelgem
 3rd Ronde van Limburg
 1956
 3rd Gent–Wevelgem
 6th Liège–Bastogne–Liège
1957
 2nd Overall Paris–Nice
1st Stage 1
 8th Paris–Bruxelles
 10th Tour of Flanders
1958
 2nd Overall Giro di Sardegna
 3rd Grand Prix d'Antibes
 5th Overall Tour de Suisse
1st Stage 5 
 10th Milan–San Remo

References

External links

1920 births
1970 deaths
Belgian male cyclists
Belgian Tour de France stage winners
People from Anderlecht
Tour de Suisse stage winners
Cyclists from Brussels
20th-century Belgian people